Karl Schwarzschild (9 October 1873 – 11 May 1916) was a German physicist and astronomer.

Schwarzschild provided the first exact solution to the Einstein field equations of general relativity, for the limited case of a single spherical non-rotating mass, which he accomplished in 1915, the same year that Einstein first introduced general relativity.  The Schwarzschild solution, which makes use of Schwarzschild coordinates and the Schwarzschild metric, leads to a derivation of the Schwarzschild radius, which is the size of the event horizon of a non-rotating black hole.

Schwarzschild accomplished this while serving in the German army during World War I.  He died the following year from the autoimmune disease pemphigus, which he developed while at the Russian front. Various forms of the disease particularly affect people of Ashkenazi Jewish origin.

Asteroid 837 Schwarzschilda is named in his honour, as is the large crater Schwarzschild, on the far side of the Moon.

Life
Karl Schwarzschild was born on 9 October 1873 in  Frankfurt on Main, the eldest of six boys and one daughter, to Jewish parents. His father was active in the business community of the city, and the family had ancestors in Frankfurt from the sixteenth century onwards. The family owned two fabric stores in Frankfurt. His brother Alfred became a painter. The young Schwarzschild attended a Jewish primary school until 11 years of age and then the Lessing-Gymnasium (secondary school). He received an all-encompassing education, including subjects like Latin, Ancient Greek, music and art, but developed a special interest in astronomy early on. In fact he was something of a child prodigy, having two papers on binary orbits (celestial mechanics) published before the age of sixteen.

After graduation in 1890 he attended the University of Strasbourg to study astronomy. After two years he transferred to the Ludwig Maximilian University of Munich where he obtained his doctorate in 1896 for a work on Henri Poincaré's theories.

From 1897, he worked as assistant at the Kuffner Observatory in Vienna. His work here concentrated on the photometry of star clusters and laid the foundations for a formula linking the intensity of the starlight, exposure time, and the resulting contrast on a photographic plate. An integral part of that theory is the Schwarzschild exponent (astrophotography). In 1899 he returned to Munich to complete his Habilitation.

From 1901 until 1909 he was a professor at the prestigious Göttingen Observatory within the University of Göttingen, where he had the opportunity to work with some significant figures, including David Hilbert and Hermann Minkowski. Schwarzschild became the director of the observatory. He married Else Rosenbach, a great-granddaughter of Friedrich Wöhler and daughter of a professor of surgery at Göttingen, in 1909. Later that year they moved to Potsdam, where he took up the post of director of the Astrophysical Observatory. This was then the most prestigious post available for an astronomer in Germany.

From 1912 Schwarzschild was a member of the Prussian Academy of Sciences.

At the outbreak of World War I in 1914 Schwarzschild volunteered for service in the German army, despite being over 40 years old. He served on both the western and eastern fronts, specifically helping with ballistic calculations and rising to the rank of second lieutenant in the artillery.

While serving on the front in Russia in 1915, he began to suffer from pemphigus, a rare and painful autoimmune skin-disease. Nevertheless, he managed to write three outstanding papers, two on the theory of relativity and one on quantum theory. His papers on relativity produced the first exact solutions to the Einstein field equations, and a minor modification of these results gives the well-known solution that now bears his name — the Schwarzschild metric.

In March 1916 Schwarzschild left military service because of his illness and returned to Göttingen. Two months later, on May 11, 1916, his struggle with pemphigus may have led to his death at the age of 42.

He rests in his family grave at the Stadtfriedhof Göttingen.

With his wife Else he had three children:

 Agathe Thornton (1910-2006) emigrated to Great Britain in 1933. In 1946 she moved to New Zealand, where she became a classics professor at the University of Otago in Dunedin.
 Martin Schwarzschild (1912-1997) became a professor of astronomy at Princeton University.
 Alfred Schwarzschild (1914-1944) remained in Nazi Germany and was murdered during the Holocaust.

Work
Thousands of dissertations, articles, and books have since been devoted to the study of Schwarzschild's solutions to the Einstein field equations. However, although his best known work lies in the area of general relativity, his research interests were extremely broad, including work in celestial mechanics, observational stellar photometry, quantum mechanics, instrumental astronomy, stellar structure, stellar statistics, Halley's comet, and spectroscopy.

Some of his particular achievements include measurements of variable stars, using photography, and the improvement of optical systems, through the perturbative investigation of geometrical aberrations.

Physics of photography
While at Vienna in 1897, Schwarzschild developed a formula, now known as the Schwarzschild law, to calculate the optical density of photographic material.

This formula was important for enabling more accurate photographic measurements of the intensities of faint astronomical sources.

Electrodynamics

According to Wolfgang Pauli (Theory of relativity), Schwarzschild is the first to introduce the correct Lagrangian formalism of the electromagnetic field  as

He also introduced a field free variational formulation of electrodynamics (also known as "action at distance" or "direct interparticle action")  based only on the world line of particles as 

where  are the world lines of the particle,  the (vectorial) arc element along the world line. Two points on two world lines contribute to the Lagrangian (are coupled) only if they are a zero Minkowskian distance (connected by a light ray), hence the term . The idea was further developed by Tetrode 
and Fokker  in the 1920s and Wheeler and Feynman in the 1940s  and constitutes an alternative/equivalent formulation of electrodynamics.

Relativity

Einstein himself was pleasantly surprised to learn that the field equations admitted exact solutions, because of their prima facie complexity, and because he himself had produced only an approximate solution. Einstein's approximate solution was given in his famous 1915 article on the advance of the perihelion of Mercury. There, Einstein used rectangular coordinates to approximate the gravitational field around a spherically symmetric, non-rotating, non-charged mass. Schwarzschild, in contrast, chose a more elegant "polar-like" coordinate system and was able to produce an exact solution which he first set down in a letter to Einstein of 22 December 1915, written while he was serving in the war stationed on the Russian front. He concluded the letter by writing: "As you see, the war treated me kindly enough, in spite of the heavy gunfire, to allow me to get away from it all and take this walk in the land of your ideas." In 1916, Einstein wrote to Schwarzschild on this result:

Schwarzschild's second paper, which gives what is now known as the "Inner Schwarzschild solution" (in German: "innere Schwarzschild-Lösung"), is valid within a sphere of homogeneous and isotropic distributed molecules within a shell of radius r=R. It is applicable to solids; incompressible fluids; the sun and stars viewed as a quasi-isotropic heated gas; and any homogeneous and isotropic distributed gas.

Schwarzschild's first (spherically symmetric) solution does not contain a coordinate singularity on a surface that is now named after him. In his coordinates, this singularity lies on the sphere of points at a particular radius, called the Schwarzschild radius:

where G is the gravitational constant, M is the mass of the central body, and c is the speed of light in vacuum.  In cases where the radius of the central body is less than the Schwarzschild radius,  represents the radius within which all massive bodies, and even photons, must inevitably fall into the central body (ignoring quantum tunnelling effects near the boundary). When the mass density of this central body exceeds a particular limit, it triggers a gravitational collapse which, if it occurs with spherical symmetry, produces what is known as a Schwarzschild black hole. This occurs, for example, when the mass of a neutron star exceeds the Tolman–Oppenheimer–Volkoff limit (about three solar masses).

Cultural references
Karl Schwarzschild appears as a character in the science fiction short story "Schwarzschild Radius" (1987) by Connie Willis.

Schwarzschild's Cat is a comic on XKCD.com comparing the size and cuteness of cats.

Karl Schwarzchild appears as a character in the story “Schwarzchild’s Singularity” in the collection "When We Cease to Understand the World" (2020) by Benjamín Labatut.

Works

The scientific estate of Karl Schwarzschild is stored in a special collection of the Lower Saxony National- and University Library of Göttingen.

Relativity
 Über das Gravitationsfeld eines Massenpunktes nach der Einstein’schen Theorie. Reimer, Berlin 1916, S. 189 ff. (Sitzungsberichte der Königlich-Preussischen Akademie der Wissenschaften; 1916)
 Über das Gravitationsfeld einer Kugel aus inkompressibler Flüssigkeit. Reimer, Berlin 1916, S. 424-434 (Sitzungsberichte der Königlich-Preussischen Akademie der Wissenschaften; 1916)

Other papers
 Untersuchungen zur geometrischen Optik I. Einleitung in die Fehlertheorie optischer Instrumente auf Grund des Eikonalbegriffs, 1906, Abhandlungen der Gesellschaft der Wissenschaften in Göttingen, Band 4, Nummero 1, S. 1-31
 Untersuchungen zur geometrischen Optik II. Theorie der Spiegelteleskope, 1906, Abhandlungen der Gesellschaft der Wissenschaften in Göttingen, Band 4, Nummero 2, S. 1-28
 Untersuchungen zur geometrischen Optik III. Über die astrophotographischen Objektive, 1906, Abhandlungen der Gesellschaft der Wissenschaften in Göttingen, Band 4, Nummero 3, S. 1-54
 Über Differenzformeln zur Durchrechnung optischer Systeme, 1907, Nachrichten von der Gesellschaft der Wissenschaften zu Göttingen, S. 551-570
 Aktinometrie der Sterne der B. D. bis zur Größe 7.5 in der Zone 0° bis +20° Deklination. Teil A. Unter Mitwirkung von Br. Meyermann, A. Kohlschütter und O. Birck, 1910, Abhandlungen der Gesellschaft der Wissenschaften in Göttingen, Band 6, Numero 6, S. 1-117
 Über das Gleichgewicht der Sonnenatmosphäre, 1906, Nachrichten von der Gesellschaft der Wissenschaften zu Göttingen, S. 41-53
 Die Beugung und Polarisation des Lichts durch einen Spalt. I., 1902, Mathematische Annalen, Band 55, S. 177-247
 Zur Elektrodynamik. I. Zwei Formen des Princips der Action in der Elektronentheorie, 1903, Nachrichten von der Gesellschaft der Wissenschaften zu Göttingen, S. 126-131
 Zur Elektrodynamik. II. Die elementare elektrodynamische Kraft, 1903, Nachrichten von der Gesellschaft der Wissenschaften zu Göttingen, S. 132-141
 Zur Elektrodynamik. III. Ueber die Bewegung des Elektrons, 1903, Nachrichten von der Gesellschaft der Wissenschaften zu Göttingen, S. 245-278
 Ueber die Eigenbewegungen der Fixsterne, 1907, Nachrichten von der Gesellschaft der Wissenschaften zu Göttingen, S. 614-632
 Ueber die Bestimmung von Vertex und Apex nach der Ellipsoidhypothese aus einer geringeren Anzahl beobachteter Eigenbewegungen, 1908, Nachrichten von der Gesellschaft der Wissenschaften zu Göttingen, S. 191-200
 K. Schwarzschild, E. Kron: Ueber die Helligkeitsverteilung im Schweif des Halley´schen Kometen, 1911, Nachrichten von der Gesellschaft der Wissenschaften zu Göttingen, S. 197-208
 Die naturwissenschaftlichen Ergebnisse und Ziele der neueren Mechanik., 1904, Jahresbericht der Deutschen Mathematiker-Vereinigung, Band 13, S. 145-156
 Über die astronomische Ausbildung der Lehramtskandidaten., 1907, Jahresbericht der Deutschen Mathematiker-Vereinigung, Band 16, S. 519-522

English translations
 On the Gravitational Field of a Point-Mass, According to Einstein's Theory, The Abraham Zelmanov Journal, 2008, Volume 1, P. 10-19
 On the Gravitational Field of a Sphere of Incompressible Liquid, According to Einstein's Theory, The Abraham Zelmanov Journal, 2008, Volume 1, P. 20-32
 On the Permissible Numerical Value of the Curvature of Space, The Abraham Zelmanov Journal, Volume 1, 2008, pp. 64-73

See also
List of things named after Karl Schwarzschild

References

External links

 
 Roberto B. Salgado The Light Cone: The Schwarzschild Black Hole
 Obituary in the Astrophysical Journal, written by Ejnar Hertzsprung
 
 Biography of Karl Schwarzschild  by Indranu Suhendro, The Abraham Zelmanov Journal, 2008, Volume 1.

1873 births
1916 deaths
Jewish astronomers
19th-century German astronomers
German relativity theorists
German Ashkenazi Jews
Jewish physicists
Ludwig Maximilian University of Munich alumni
Members of the Prussian Academy of Sciences
Scientists from Frankfurt
People from Hesse-Nassau
University of Strasbourg alumni
Academic staff of the University of Göttingen
German Jewish military personnel of World War I
20th-century German astronomers
Deaths from autoimmune disease
German military personnel killed in World War I